Mukungwa Ruhengeri is a football club from Ruhengeri in Rwanda.

In 1988 the team has won the Rwandan Premier League.

Stadium
The team plays at the Stade Regional de Kigali.

Performance in CAF competitions
CAF Champions League: 
1989 African Cup of Champions Clubs – First Round

Achievements
Rwandan Premier League  (2)
 1988, 1989

References

External links

Football clubs in Rwanda